Caryophylliina is a suborder of stony corals, order Scleractinia.

List of families
 Caryophylliidae Dana, 1846
 Flabellidae Bourne, 1905
 Gardineriidae Stolarski, 1996
 Guyniidae Hickson, 1910
 Turbinoliidae Milne-Edwards and Haime, 1848

References

External links 
 
 Caryophylliina at Animal Diversity Web
 

Scleractinia
Cnidarian suborders